Michael Richardson Bach (born July 25, 1960 in Staten Island, New York) is an American former competitive rower and Olympic silver medalist.

Career

A three-year letterman, he rowed in the No.3 seat of the heavyweight varsity eight-oared crew which won the Intercollegiate Rowing Association (IRA) championship in both 1981 and 1982. The varsity eight competed for the Grand Challenge Cup at the Henley Royal Regatta in 1981, while the 1982 varsity went on to place second at the Cincinnati Regatta in 1982. As a sophomore in 1980, he also rowed in the No.3 seat in the junior varsity eight which won the IRA championship. As a member of the U.S. rowing team, he rowed in the four-man with coxswain crew which won a silver medal at the 1984 Olympic Games in Los Angeles. He was a graduate of William H. Hall High School in West Hartford, Conn.

At the 1984 Summer Olympics, Bach finished in 2nd place in the men's coxed fours competition with Edwards Ives, Thomas Kiefer, Gregory Springer, and John Stillings.

References

 
https://cornellbigred.com/hof.aspx?hof=167&mobile=skip

1960 births
Living people
Rowers at the 1984 Summer Olympics
Olympic silver medalists for the United States in rowing
American male rowers
Medalists at the 1984 Summer Olympics